Dag Krister Volle (26 April 1963 – 30 August 1998), better known as Denniz Pop (stylized Denniz PoP), was a Swedish DJ, music producer, and songwriter. He co-founded the recording studio Cheiron Studios in Stockholm in 1992.

Life and career
Volle was born on 26 April 1963 to the Norwegian immigrants Jarl Gregar Volle and Anna Volle (née Innstøy). He began as a DJ in the 1980s, and started producing remixed records and later original releases, producing Dr. Alban's single "Hello Afrika" in 1990. With Tom Talomaa, he founded the Cheiron Studios on Kungsholmen in Stockholm in 1992, and the next year recruited Max Martin (Martin Sandberg) to the studio. In the following years, he produced and wrote songs for several successful Swedish and foreign artists, including 3T, Ace of Base, Backstreet Boys, Britney Spears, N'Sync, E-Type, Dr Alban, Robyn, and 5ive.

In an interview, Volle said that he took the name "Denniz" from a comic book and then added "pop" to it.

Death
In August 1998, Volle died of stomach cancer at the age of 35. The video to the Backstreet Boys' "Show Me the Meaning of Being Lonely" and Jessica Folker's song "A Little Bit" were dedicated to him. E-Type's album Last Man Standing commemorates Dag with a dirge, the final track "PoP Preludium". Britney Spears dedicated her award for Best Song at the 1999 MTV Europe Music Awards to him.

Legacy
The Denniz Pop Awards were created in 2013 by former members of Cheiron Studios to help distinguish Scandinavian songwriters, producers, and artists. Notable winners include Swedish House Mafia and Avicii. Cheiron became the start of a Swedish wave of successful producers and songwriters, with Max Martin as the biggest star. Other prominent producers who were part of Cheiron include Rami Yacoub, Kristian Lundin, Per Magnusson, Jörgen Elofsson, and Andreas Carlsson.

References

External links
 Denniz Pop @ Disco-Disco.com
 SweMix @ Disco-Disco.com
 Denniz Pop on Discogs

1963 births
1998 deaths
Swedish people of Norwegian descent
Swedish record producers
Swedish songwriters
Deaths from stomach cancer
Swedish music awards
Deaths from cancer in Sweden